The Other Woman is a 1983 American made-for-television romantic comedy film  directed  by Melville Shavelson. The film  was originally broadcast on CBS. It was the only television film directed by Shavelson that he did not also write.

Cast

References

External links
 

1983 television films
1983 films
1983 romantic comedy films
American romantic comedy films
CBS network films
Films directed by Melville Shavelson
1980s English-language films
1980s American films